Below are the rosters for the 1981 FIFA World Youth Championship tournament in Australia. Those marked in bold went on to earn full international caps.

Group A

Head coach: Waldemar Obrebski

Head coach:  Evaristo de Macedo

Head coach: Raúl Bentancor

Head coach: Walt Chyzowych

Group B

Head coach: Vavá

Head coach: Italo Acconcia

Head coach: Park Jong-Hwan

Head coach: Constantin Cernăianu

Group C

Head coach: Mohamed Seddik

Head coach: Alfonso Portugal

Head coach: Chus Pereda

Head coach: Dietrich Weise

Group D

Head coach: Roberto Saporiti

Head coach: Les Scheinflug

Head coach: Radivoje Ognjanović

(N°3)Jules Denis Onana DF 12/06/1964 Canon Yaounde Cameroon

Head coach: John Cartwright

References 

 FIFA pages on 1981 World Youth Cup

Fifa World Youth Championship Squads, 1981
FIFA U-20 World Cup squads